Brigitte Simon-Glinel (born 1 November 1956) is a French former professional tennis player. She competed under her maiden name Brigitte Simon.

Simon, a semi-finalist at the 1978 French Open, represented France in 14 Federation Cup ties. She played in two Federation Cup quarter-final ties with France and both times came up against Chris Evert, for two losses. 

A three-time winner of the national championships, Simon was the French number one between 1978 and 1981.

See also
List of France Fed Cup team representatives

References

External links
 
 
 

1956 births
Living people
French female tennis players
Sportspeople from Caen